Colella is a surname. Notable people with the surname include:

 Anton Colella, Scottish businessman
 Antonio Colella (born 1961), Italian rugby union player and sports director
 Hugo Colella (born 1999), French footballer
 Jenn Colella (born 1974), American actress and singer
 Laura Colella, American filmmaker
 Leonardo Colella (1930–2010), Brazilian football striker
 Lynn Colella (born 1950), American swimmer
 Phillip Colella (born 1952), American applied mathematician
 Rick Colella (born 1951), American swimmer, brother of Lynn
 Tommy Colella (1918–1992), American football halfback and punter

See also
 Colella, an unaccepted name for a genus of sea squirts in suborder Aplousobranchia

Italian-language surnames